Mark O'Brien (born 22 September 1995) is an Irish hurler who plays for Waterford Championship club Ferrybank and at inter-county level with the Waterford senior hurling team. He usually lines out as a midfielder.

Honours

Waterford
All-Ireland Under-21 Hurling Championship (1): 2016
Munster Under-21 Hurling Championship (1): 2016
All-Ireland Minor Hurling Championship (1): 2013

References

1995 births
Living people
UCC hurlers
Ferrybank hurlers
Waterford inter-county hurlers